The road network in Jamaica consists of almost  of roads, of which over  is paved. The numbering scheme used covers freeways, primary (or A) roads, secondary (or B) roads, parochial roads and unclassified roads.

Motorways
Starting in the late 1990s the Jamaican Government (in cooperation with private investors) embarked on the Highway 2000 project to create a system of motorways, the first such access-controlled roads of their kind on the island. The project seeks ultimately to link the two main cities (Kingston and Montego Bay) and the north coast. It is being undertaken as a series of phases:
Phase 1a was the  Kingston-Bushy Park Highway (in actuality, from the Mandela Highway at Caymanas Park to Sandy Bay) which was completed in 2003, and the upgrade of the Portmore Causeway, completed June 2006.
Phase 1B  Sandy Bay to Four Paths which was completed on 15 August 2012 and opened as the T1 Toll Road. Work on the section from Four Paths to Williamsfield has yet to start. This phase will be a total of  when completed.
Phase 2a Caymanas Park-Ocho Rios. The section from Linstead By-Pass to Moneague opened as the T3 on 5 August 2014, . This exit allows northbound traffic to exit to the A1 and southbound traffic to join the T3. 
Phase 2b Mandeville-Montego Bay.

On 2009-09-15 Jamaica's prime minister, Bruce Golding, announced to Parliament that Highway 2000 was to be renamed in honour of Usain Bolt. Those intentions were sidelined following a news paper article claiming Bolt had rejected the proposal.

Northern Coastal Highway

1998, the Government of Jamaica and the European Commission signed the financing agreement for the third segment of the Northern Coastal Highway Improvement Project in the amount of €80 million. Total cost of the project is €105.0 million with the GOJ contributing €25 million for land acquisition and re-settlement as well as the construction of three bridges along the segment.

· Segment 1 – Negril to Montego Bay (approx. )
· Segment 2 – Montego Bay to Ocho Rios (approx. )
· Segment 3 – Ocho Rios to Fair Prospect (approx. )

Southern Coastal Highway

Approval has been given by Cabinet for the execution of a contract between the government and China Harbour Engineering Company Ltd. for the design, improvement and construction of Sections 1A and 1B of the Southern Coastal Highway Improvement Project.  This will involve work from Harbour View to Morant Bay as part of the overall Segment from Harbour View to Port Antonio.

The existing main road along this southern coastal section of the island has been in generally poor condition. The alignment, surface condition, drainage are in need of major improvement.

The work on the Harbour View to Morant Bay leg is estimated to cost approximately US$385 million.

Among the improvement works will be a re alignment of the White Horses Bypass to the south of the town along the sea coast rather than to the north and modification of the Morant Bay Bypass at the western and eastern ends.

A section of the highway will also be constructed to accommodate four lanes and major structures are to be built including 16 bridges, one flyover, and one subway, along with new pipe and box culverts.

Financing for the project is through the China Exim Bank. It is being accommodated in the 5-year Public Sector Investment Programmes covering the period from 2016 to 2021.

A Roads

B Roads

Parochial Roads
Parochial roads are a local responsibility, being maintained by parish councils. They are too numerous to list individually.

Unclassified Roads
Unclassified roads are a local responsibility, being maintained by parish councils. They are too numerous to list individually

See also
Transport in Jamaica#Roadways

References

Sources
Jamaica Road Map, General Drafting Company Inc., Esso Standard Oil SA Limited, 1967.
Jamaica Road Map. Rand McNally and Company, Texaco, 1972.